Apoaerenica martinsi is a species of beetle in the family Cerambycidae, and the only species in the genus Apoaerenica. It was described by Monné in 1979.

References

Aerenicini
Beetles described in 1979
Monotypic Cerambycidae genera